Soothill is a small village in the town of Batley, West Yorkshire, England. The name derives from the Old English "sot" and means a place where wood was burnt.

Soothill was on the Great Northern Railway's Leeds to Batley branch line, although no station was provided. The colliery at Soothill, adjacent to the railway, was the scene of a rail accident in February 1920 between a goods train and a passenger train. The accident was not fatal with only injuries being recorded. The railway was closed in 1953 leaving a disused tunnel (Soothill Tunnel) north east of the settlement. This tunnel has been bricked up as it contains toxic gases.

References 

Batley
Villages in West Yorkshire